United Thai Nation Party is a Thai political party registered in March 2021 by Seksakon Atthawong, former Deputy Minister to the Prime Minister (General Prayut Chan-o-cha). Later, at the end of 2022, General Prayut decided to participate in political activities with the party.

History

Party's founding period 
United Thai Nation Party is a registered political party No. 5/2021 on 31 March 2021, with Seksakon Atthawong as the founder of the party. There is the first party office at 169/98 Serm Sub Building Ratchadapisek Rd., Ratchadaphisek Subdistrict, Din Daeng District, Bangkok.

Prayut's decision to join the party 
On Friday, 23 December 2022, Prime Minister General Prayut Chan-o-cha said he had decided to apply for membership of the United Thai Nation Party and was ready to accept the nomination from party members for another term as prime minister. In the election that will be held in 2023, there has been talks with General Prawit Wongsuwon, Deputy Prime Minister and leader of the Palang Pracharath Party. It is expected that General Prayut will assume the position of party chairman and chairman of the steering committee or the party's superboard as well. In the afternoon of the same day, the Party Executive Committee convened a meeting at the Party headquarters on Soi Aree.

After the announcement of the United Thai Nation Party membership of General Prayut Seksakol Atthawong, leader of the Terd Thai Party, decided to resign from the party, and rejoined the United Thai Nation Party, causing him to leave the position of the Terd Thai Party leader. While Chatchawal Kong-udom, the strategy chairman of the Thai Local Power Party, gave an interview that he was preparing to join the United Thai Nation Party, but did not specify whether he would resign from being an MP or not. Then Party Leader Peeraphan, Party Secretary Akanat, Duangrit, the Party Deputy Leader and Party Treasurer Prakromsak held a press conference at the Party Headquarters after the meeting of the Executive Committee.

On 26 December 2022, Chatchawal, together with Noppadol Kaewsupat, another party-list MP from the Thai Local Power Party, submitted a letter of resignation from being a MP and party member by Chatchawal prepare to launch as a member of the United Thai Nation Party. The next day, Chatchawal along with Dr. Trairong Suwankiri and Chumpol Kanchana, two former members of the Democrat Party Advisory Council has officially launched as a member of the United Thai Nation Party. On the same day, party leader Peeraphan said Gen Prayut would apply for membership in early 2023 after the New Year.

In early 2023, there was a news that General Prayut was preparing to apply for membership in the United Thai Nation Party in mid-January. General Prayut gave an interview to reporters on 3 January 2023, stating that he would definitely apply for membership in the United Thai Nation Party, but had not yet set a clear date. It also did not confirm whether he would be the party chairman and chairman of the party's super board according to previous news. On the same day, Picharat Laohaphongchana, party-list MP of the Palang Pracharath Party has submitted a letter of resignation from being an MP and a member of the party to join the United Thai Nation Party.

The next day, there was news that General Prayut was preparing to apply for a party membership at the launch event conference on Monday, 9 January 2023 at the Queen Sirikit National Convention Center. Peeraphan said it was likely that Gen. Prayut would apply for a party membership that day but still have to wait for a clear conclusion.

References

External links 
 

Political parties in Thailand
Political parties established in 2021